Pohulanka may refer to the following places in Poland:
Pohulanka, Chełm County in Lublin Voivodeship (east Poland)
Pohulanka, Parczew County in Lublin Voivodeship (east Poland)
Pohulanka, Podlaskie Voivodeship (north-east Poland)
Pohulanka, Masovian Voivodeship (east-central Poland)